MP 28 or MP-28 may refer to:

Chattian, MP 28, a stage during the Oligocene epoch
MP 28, a German submachine gun, a development of the MP 18